Kalevi Laurila (5 December 1937 – 13 April 1991) was a Finnish cross-country skier. He competed in all cross-country skiing events at the 1964 and 1968 Olympics and won two medals in the 4 × 10 km relay, placing fourth-eleventh in individual events. At the world championships he won three silver medals, in the 30 km in 1966 and in the 4 × 10 km relay in 1962 and 1966. His last international competition was the 1974 World Championships, where his relay team finished fourth. Domestically he won seven titles, in the 15 km (1967–68, 1970 and 1974), 30 km (1966 and 1968) and 50 km (1967).

Laurila was a decorated police sergeant. Besides skiing Laurila he competed in rowing and biathlon, winning a silver medal in 1973 and a bronze in 1978 at the European Police Championships. In rowing he won the 1967 national title in coxless fours.

Cross-country skiing results
All results are sourced from the International Ski Federation (FIS).

Olympic Games
 2 medals – (1 silver, 1 bronze)

World Championships
 3 medals – (3 silver)

References

External links

 

1937 births
1991 deaths
Finnish male cross-country skiers
Cross-country skiers at the 1964 Winter Olympics
Cross-country skiers at the 1968 Winter Olympics
Olympic medalists in cross-country skiing
FIS Nordic World Ski Championships medalists in cross-country skiing
Medalists at the 1964 Winter Olympics
Medalists at the 1968 Winter Olympics
Olympic silver medalists for Finland
Olympic bronze medalists for Finland
Sportspeople from Pirkanmaa
20th-century Finnish people